Kelly Forbes Mader (February 12, 1952 – June 24, 2016) was an American rancher and politician.

Born in Sheridan, Wyoming, Mader was a rancher, auctioneer, and real estate broker. He was also involved with the coal industry. Mader lived in Campbell County, Wyoming. Mader served on the Wyoming House of Representatives in 1983 and 1984 and was a Republican. He then served in the Wyoming State Senate from 1985 to 1991. He died suddenly from a heart attack at his home in College Station, Texas at age 64. His brother Troy Mader also served in the Wyoming Legislature.

Notes

1952 births
2016 deaths
People from College Station, Texas
People from Sheridan, Wyoming
Ranchers from Wyoming
Republican Party members of the Wyoming House of Representatives
Republican Party Wyoming state senators
20th-century American politicians